DCT may refer to:

Science and technology
 DCT (videocassette format), a videocassette format developed by Ampex
 Discovery Channel Telescope, former name of the Lowell Discovery Telescope, US
 Dual-clutch transmission, a vehicle technology which allows gears to be selected in fully manual or automatic mode

Biology and medicine
 Direct Coombs test, used to test for autoimmune hemolytic anemia
 Distal convoluted tubule, a part of the functional unit of the kidney
 Dopachrome tautomerase, a human gene

Mathematics
 Discrete cosine transform, a mathematical transform related to the Fourier transform and widely used in digital data compression
 Dominated convergence theorem, a central mathematical theorem in the theory of integration first proposed by Henri Lebesgue

Other uses
 Death Come True, an 2020 adventure video game
 Director Control Tower, a facility equipped to direct and control a ship's gun battery
 Discourse-completion task, a pragmatics research method in linguistics
 Dreams Come True (band), a Japanese band
 Danescourt railway station (National Rail station code), Wales
 Divine Command Theory, a moral theory which holds that divine revelation (especially by God) is the basis for morality

See also
 Motorola DCT2000, a set-top-box device used for receiving digital cable TV